Piddletown is an extinct town in Ralls County, in the U.S. state of Missouri.

The community took its name from nearby Piddletown School.  According to tradition, the schoolhouse was named after a local family who often were seen doing nothing or "piddling". The Piddletown School is now defunct.

References

Ghost towns in Missouri
Former populated places in Ralls County, Missouri